Daniel G. Quackenboss (1812June 22, 1853) was an American politician.

Early life 
Quackenboss was born in New York in 1812.

Political career 
Quackenboss served as a member of the New York State Assembly from the Greene County district in 1841.  Around 1845, he moved to Tecumseh, Michigan. While living in Michigan, he served as a member of the Michigan House of Representatives from the Lenawee County district from 1848 to 1851. During his last term in the Michigan House of Representatives, in 1853, he represented the Lenawee County 1st district, and served as the Speaker of the Michigan House of Representatives.

Personal life 
Quackenboss married Elizabeth, and together they had two children.

Death 
Quackenboss died on June 22, 1853. He is interred at Brookside Cemetery, which is in Tecumseh, Michigan.

References 

1812 births
1853 deaths
Speakers of the Michigan House of Representatives
Democratic Party members of the Michigan House of Representatives
Democratic Party members of the New York State Assembly
Burials in Michigan
19th-century American politicians